Onomatopoeia is a supervillain appearing in comic books published by DC Comics, usually as an enemy of Green Arrow and Batman. Created by writer Kevin Smith and artist Phil Hester, the character first appeared in Green Arrow (vol. 3) #12 (March 2002).

Publication history
Kevin Smith discussed the character in a 2007 interview:

Fictional character biography
Onomatopoeia first appears where he murders a female crimefighter named Virago, after telling her his name. The interlude in which this occurs serves as a lead-in to "The Sounds of Violence", a three-issue storyline that runs through issues #13–15 of the title, in which he is the main antagonist. No personal characteristics are revealed about Onomatopoeia aside from the fact that he is a Caucasian male, which is seen when portions of his face obscured by shadow are seen in Green Arrow (vol. 3) #14, and when the lower half of his face is seen again in issue #15. Onomatopoeia is a serial killer who targets non-superpowered superheroes. His name is derived from the fact that he imitates noises around him, such as dripping taps, gunshots, etc. During the course of this storyline, he shoots Connor Hawke, the second Green Arrow, who is saved by his father Oliver Queen (the first and original Green Arrow). While Connor is undergoing surgery in the hospital, Onomatopoeia returns to finish the job. He kills several doctors in the operating room, and after his attempt to kill Connor is foiled by Queen and Black Canary, he manages to escape.

He is later recruited by Alexander Luthor, Jr.'s Secret Society of Super Villains as part of an army that is sent to conquer the city of Metropolis in issue #7 of the 2006 miniseries Infinite Crisis. A superhero army, backed up by the National Guard, successfully opposes the Society. Onomatopoeia is seen in a brawl with the Odd Man, a costumed, un-powered vigilante.

The character appears in the November 2008 three-issue miniseries Batman: Cacophony which was written by Smith and pencilled by his longtime collaborator and friend Walt Flanagan. Onomatopoeia frees the Joker from Arkham Asylum and gives him money to finance a gang war against Maxie Zeus. Eventually he confronts Batman, who defeats him. He escapes capture, however, by mortally wounding the Joker, forcing Batman to choose between saving the Joker's life and capturing his new opponent. The end of the third issue reveals that Onomatopoeia has a secret, seemingly normal life as a loving husband and the father of two children, who are unaware of his murderous activities. He explains his occasional injuries as the result of sporting activities such as tennis, polo, and hunting. He keeps mementos of his victories in a hidden shrine behind a bookcase, saving a case each for Batman and Green Arrow.

In Batman: The Widening Gyre, it is revealed that he has been in disguise as Baphomet, a new vigilante who had been teaming up with Batman. He appears as Baphomet early on, helping the Dark Knight defeat Etrigan the Demon and Poison Ivy. He later assists Batman in defeating villains such as Deadshot, Crazy Quilt, and Calendar Man, even unmasking himself in front of Batman to gain his trust (as Batman had no idea what Onomatopoeia actually looked like, this did not reveal the ruse). At the storyline's end Batman takes Baphomet into the Batcave and introduces him to a disguised Silver St. Cloud before Batman reveals that he is Bruce Wayne and Silver unmasks herself. Bruce invites Baphomet to stay for breakfast as he turns away and puts his utility belt on the table with a "KA-KLAK". He hears Baphomet repeating the sound before turning in horror to see Onomatopoeia midway through slicing Silver's throat and mimicking the noise of the blade.

Rebirth
Onomatopoeia first appeared in the New 52 in the pages of Teen Titans. He appears inside a mover's truck on a ferry, the vehicle packed with explosives, seemingly wishing to blow up the ferry. However, Red Arrow arrives on the scene, apprehending him on the ferry and driving the truck into the ocean. This was all a part of his plan however, as the fusion bomb in the truck soon detonates in the water, setting off a massive tidal wave that headed straight towards Star City.

While the arriving Teen Titans and Red Arrow worked to save the city from the incoming tidal wave, Onomatopoeia broke into Queen Industries in the chaos, stealing high-grade weapons. As the team eventually saves the city, the serial killer then began to open fire down onto them with the weaponry he stole. However, Robin and Kid Flash were able to get around the firing bullets and defeat him. Onomatopoeia was among the villains captured by Robin and illegally imprisoned in a secret location.[3] He later took part in the prison breakout but was apprehended and imprisoned once more.

Once Robin's illegal prison was discovered, Damian decided to brainwash his prisoners, including Onomatopoeia, into becoming citizens using the magic of Djinn. This magic would wear off however once Djinn was imprisoned within her ring by fellow member Roundhouse. Because of this, the villains who had been wronged by this band of Titans joined, using their combined wealth to hire Deathstroke to take revenge for them.
After this plan failed, Onomatopoeia was not long after defeated once again by the Teen Titans and was properly arrested.

Powers and abilities
Onomatopoeia is an athlete, martial artist and weapons expert. He invariably carries two semiautomatic handguns, a sniper rifle, and an army knife. He appears to be quite intelligent, having orchestrated the Joker's escape to draw out Batman, as well as avoiding capture by giving the Joker a near-fatal wound, causing Batman to be distracted. His usual outfit consists of black gloves, pants, and shirt, with a long black trench coat and a full, black hood decorated by concentric white circles. In Batman: Cacophony, it is revealed that he collects the masks of heroes he kills, keeping them in a trophy case in his secret identity's house. His marksmanship has been shown to rival even Deadshot's.

It remains unrevealed whether or not Onomatopoeia is a metahuman, however, it has been noted by the Green Arrow that he is enhanced in some way. In Green Arrow (vol. 3) #15, he was shot with six arrows: two to one shoulder, with one fatally piercing through the left side of his chest, one arrow in between the first and middle knuckles of his right hand, one through his right foot, and one through the palm of his right hand – none of which slows him down or even impairs his manual dexterity. In the same issue he even catches one of the Green Arrow's arrows in midair, using only his teeth. After being shot, he jumps off the roof of the Star City hospital, falling seven stories, and runs away before the Green Arrow can find him. He is also durable enough to survive direct explosions and fires that would kill normal human beings.

In other media
 Onomatopoeia appears in the "Green Arrow" segment of DC Nation Shorts. This version is served by Ono-Bots (voiced by Kevin Michael Richardson).
 Onomatopoeia appears in issue #12 of Arrow: Season 2.5.
 Onomatopoeia appears in the third season of Superman & Lois.

References

External links

 Onomatopoeia on Comic Vine

Fictional serial killers
Comics characters introduced in 2002
DC Comics supervillains
DC Comics martial artists
Characters created by Phil Hester
Characters created by Kevin Smith
Fictional characters without a name